Parkour Everydaily is a 2013 Chinese smartphone parkour video game released by Tencent. The game is the first cell phone game that arrived CNY 100 million (US$16.27 million) profits.

References

External links 

 

2013 video games
Android (operating system) games
China-exclusive video games
IOS games
Parkour video games
Video games developed in China